Pseudoduganella is a genus of bacteria in the family of Oxalobacteraceae.

References

Further reading 
 

Burkholderiales
Bacteria genera